Moturiki Island is a small island located just off Mount Maunganui beach, in the North Island of New Zealand. The island is connected to the beach by a man made land bridge.  NIWA maintains a tide meter on Moturiki Island. Moturiki Island offers walking, bird watching, fishing and rock climbing opportunities.

In 1966, Marineland Limited built an aquarium called "Marineland" on the island; this closed in May 1981. Later in 1981, "Marineland" was reconstructed into "Leisure Island", a water park with swimming pools, bumper boats and a hydro slide.  The water park operated until 1990, when it was removed from the island.

See also

 Desert island
 List of islands of New Zealand

References

Uninhabited islands of New Zealand
Climbing areas of New Zealand
Tauranga
Bay of Plenty Region